Birt is a surname.

Birt may also refer to:

 Birt Acres (1854–1918), photographer and film pioneer
 Birt (crater), a lunar impact crater named after William Radcliffe Birt
 Birt, a member of the flatfish family Scophthalmidae, related to the turbot and brill

See also 
 BIRT (disambiguation)
 Bert (disambiguation)
 Burt (disambiguation)